Ornella Livingston (born 19 May 1991), is a Jamaican young sprinter who represented Jamaica at The Carifta Games, and The Pan American Games. She is a former Holmwood Technical sprinter both in 100 m and 200 m.

References

1991 births
Living people
Jamaican female sprinters
Place of birth missing (living people)
Athletes (track and field) at the 2011 Pan American Games
Pan American Games competitors for Jamaica